Shoot Down is a 2006 documentary regarding the events surrounding the Brothers to the Rescue organization and the eventual shootdown of two of its aircraft.

Based on five reviews collected by Rotten Tomatoes, 80% of the critics enjoyed Shoot Down with an average rating of 7/10.

References

External links 
 
 
 
 

American documentary films
Documentary films about aviation accidents or incidents
Documentary films about Cuba
2000s English-language films
2000s American films